The Maranao people (Maranao: ['mәranaw]; Filipino: Maranaw), also spelled Meranao, Maranaw, and Mëranaw, is the term used by the Philippine government to refer to the southern indigenous people who are the "people of the lake", a predominantly-Muslim Lanao province region of the Philippine island of Mindanao. They are known for their artwork, weaving, wood, plastic and metal crafts and epic literature, the Darangen. They are ethnically and culturally closely related to the Iranun, and Maguindanao, all three groups being denoted as speaking Danao languages and giving name to the island of Mindanao.

Etymology 

The name "Maranao" (also spelled "Meranao", "Meranaw", or "Maranaw") means "people of the lake" (lanaw or ranaw, archaic danaw, means "lake" in the Maranao language). This is in reference to Lake Lanao, the predominant geographic feature of the ancestral homeland of the Maranao people.

The original endonym of the ancestral Maranao is believed to be "Iranaoan". This group later diverged, resulting in the modern Maguindanao and the Iranun people (whose names can also be translated to "people of the lake"), while the ancestral Iranaoan who stayed in Lake Lanao became known as the Maranao. These three ethnic groups are still related to each other, share similar cultures and speak languages belonging to the Danao language family.

History

The Maranao were the last of the Muslims of the Southern Philippines undergoing islamicization, primarily under the influence of the Maguindanao Sultanate.

Like neighboring Moros and Lumadnon, during the nominal occupation of the Philippines by the Spanish, and later the American and the Japanese, the Maranao had tribal leaders called datu. In the 16th century, upon the arrival of Islam, they developed into a kingdom with a Sultan due to the influence of Muslim missionaries.

Culture

Maranao culture can be characterized by:

Lake Lanao
Sarimanok (Papanoka a Məra or Marapatik)
Torogan, Maranao royal houses, where the architecture used is the most aesthetic in the Philippines
Darangən, an epic UNESCO Intangible cultural heritage
Kirim, pre-Hispanic handwriting based from Arabic letters with 19 consonants and 7 vowels
Singkil, a Philippine dance based on a scene from the Darangən
Okir wood and metal carvings
Kapmorod and Kakhalilang with Sambolayang and Pasandalan a Morog and Marigay for Kazipa sa Manggis
Kaplagod (racing horses)
Tabo, a drum used in mosques to call worshippers to prayer

Maranao culture is centered around Lake Lanao, the largest lake in Mindanao, and second-largest and deepest lake in the Philippines. Lanao is the subject of various myths and legends. It supports a major fishery, and powers the hydroelectric plant installed on it; the Agus River system generates 70% of the electricity used by the people of Mindanao. A commanding view of the lake is offered by Marawi City, the provincial capital.

Visual arts

Sarimanok, Papanok a "Məra" or "Marapatik" is a legendary bird of the Maranao that is a ubiquitous symbol of their art. It is depicted as a Hoodhud (Arabic) with colorful wings and feathered tail, holding a fish on its beak or talons. The head of Sarimanok is like the head of a Hoopoe (Balalatoc in maranaw) and is profusely decorated with scroll, leaf and spiral motifs (okir). It is a symbol of good fortune.

The Maranao have also developed their own adaptation of the Ramayana epic, the Maharadia Lawana. They also have a traditional dance, the Singkil, which was based on another local Ramayana adaptation, the Darangən.

Architecture 
Traditional Maranao architecture, like elsewhere in the Philippines and at large maritime Southeast Asia, follows the Austronesian framework of wooden structures on piles, divided in three tiers pertaining to social class:torogan of royalty, mala a walay of lesser nobility, and the common lawig analogous to the bahay kubo.

Music and performing arts

 
Maranao kulintang music is a type of a gong music. Sarunaay is also found among both Muslim and non-Muslim groups of the Southern Philippines. Kobbing is a Maranao instrument and Biyula is another popular Instrument. Biyula is a string instrument. In 2005, the Darangen Epic of the Maranao people of Lake Lanao was selected by UNESCO as a Masterpiece of the Oral and Intangible Heritage of Humanity.

Cuisine
Maranao cuisine is spicier compared to most regions elsewhere in the Philippines, a trait largely shared with much of Mindanao. Traditionally cultivated spices, locally known as palapa (Bontang, native product of Gandamatu) are a common condiment. It is made of stewed sakurab scallion bulbs, ginger, and chillies in coconut oil.

Dishes are intertwined with important cultural rituals across all aspects of Maranao culture: from birth to death.

Social structure 
Traditionally, Maranao society is divided into two strata. Namely, mapiyatao (pure) and kasilidan (mixed blood). kasilidan is further subdivided into categories which are as follows; sarowang (non-Maranao), balbal (beast), dagamot (Sorcerer/Sorceress) and bisaya (Slave). The mapiyatao are natives entitled to ascend to thrones by pure royal bloodline. On the other hand, the kasilidan are natives suspected of mixed bloodline. However, due to the changes brought by time, these social strata are beginning to decline due to the rise of wealth of each and every Maranao families.

Demographics

Maranaos number 1,354,542 in 2010, representing 1.47% of the population. Along with the Iranun and Maguindanao, the Maranao are one of three, related, indigenous groups native to Mindanao. These groups share genes, linguistic and cultural ties to non-Muslim Lumad groups such as the Tiruray or Subanon. Maranao royals have varied infusions of Arab, Indian, Malay, and Chinese ancestry.

Language 

Maranao is an Austronesian language spoken by the Maranao people in the provinces of Lanao del Norte and Lanao del Sur. Because of the mass influx of Cebuano migrants to Mindanao, many Maranaos are also fluent in Cebuano.

Arabic, a Central Semitic language, is spoken by a minority of the Moro people, as it is the liturgical language of Islam. Most Maranaos, however, do not know Arabic beyond its religious use.

Notable Maranaos

 Japar Dimaampao is a present Associate Justice of the Supreme Court of the Philippines
 Mamintal A.J. Tamano was a Filipino statesman and a former Senator of the Philippines.
 Adel Tamano is a Filipino educator, lawyer and former politician.
 Domocao Alonto is a former Filipino politician and has been a great senator of the Philippines. In 1988, he was awarded the prestigious King Faisal Prize for Service to Islam.
 Mamintal M. Adiong Sr. was a long-time Filipino politician, serving as Governor of Lanao del Sur from 2001 until his death from cardiac arrest.
 Mamintal Alonto Adiong Jr. is the present governor of the Province of Lanao del Sur.
 Abul Khayr Alonto is a Filipino businessman and lawyer and a former Moro freedom fighter. He once became the chairman of Moro National Lebaration Front.
 Dimasangcay Pundato is a former Moro revolutionary leader and current undersecretary of the Office of the Presidential Adviser on the Peace Process
 Samira Gutoc-Tomawis is a Filipino civic leader, journalist, environment and women's rights advocate, and legislator[1] who has served as member of the Regional Legislative Assembly of the Autonomous Region in Muslim Mindanao and a member of the Bangsamoro Transition Commission which was tasked to draft the Bangsamoro Basic Law.
Moh Saaduddin was a journalist, peace advocates, and served as a provincial information officer of the province of Maguindanao.

See also 
Maranao language

 Iranun people

Lanao del Sur

 Lake Lanao

Confederate States of Lanao

 Sultanate of Maguindanao

Ethnic groups in the Philippines

 Moro peoples
 Iranun people
 Maguindanao people
 Lumad

Notes and references

External links
Maranao
Maranao Online
Ranao, Ranao (Lake) terms for Lanao del Sur.

Ethnic groups in Mindanao
Islam in the Philippines
Muslim communities of the Philippines
Moro ethnic groups